Gorenja Vas is a settlement in the Poljane Sora Valley and the administrative centre of the Municipality of Gorenja Vas–Poljane in the Upper Carniola region of Slovenia. In addition to the settlement core of Gorenja Vas itself, the settlement also consists of the hamlets of Sestranska Vas north of the Poljane Sora River, and Trata and Lajše south of the settlement core.

Religious heritage

The parish church is dedicated to the martyrdom of Saint John the Baptist. It dates to the second half of the 17th century and was built on the site of a smaller chapel. It was remodeled in the 18th century, when the nave was extended, the side chapels were walled in, and the current belfry and main facade were created. Paintings dating to circa 1700 decorate the nave and presbytery. The main altar is late Baroque; it has been reworked several times and has paintings by Janez Wolf (1825–1884) and Matija Bradaška (1852–1915).

Notable people
Notable people that were born or lived in Gorenja Vas include:
Anton Dolinar (sl) (1894–1953), musician, born in Trata
Ignacij Oblak (1834–1916), wood carver and gilder
Ivan Poljanec (1855–1933), wood carver
Ivan Regen (1868–1947), biologist, born in Lajše

References

External links

Gorenja Vas on Geopedia

Populated places in the Municipality of Gorenja vas-Poljane